Lois Johnson Scoggins (May 15, 1942 – July 7, 2014) was an American country music singer. She was from Maynardville, Tennessee. She recorded for different labels between 1969 and 1978, charted twenty singles on the Hot Country Songs charts. Her highest chart peak was "Loving You Will Never Grow Old", which reached No. 6 in 1975. Johnson toured with Hank Williams Jr. between 1970 and 1973.

She died at Vanderbilt University Medical Centre, Nashville, Tennessee, on July 7, 2014.

Discography

Albums

Singles

Singles with Hank Williams Jr.

References

1942 births
2014 deaths
American country singer-songwriters
American women country singers
MGM Records artists
People from Maynardville, Tennessee
Singer-songwriters from Tennessee
Country musicians from Tennessee
21st-century American women